Nienke Wasmus (born 23 October 1999) is a Dutch professional racing cyclist, who currently rides for UCI Women's Continental Team .

References

External links

1999 births
Living people
Dutch female cyclists
Place of birth missing (living people)
Cyclists from The Hague
21st-century Dutch women